Forskolin (coleonol) is a labdane diterpene produced by the plant Coleus barbatus (Blue Spur Flower). Other names include pashanabhedi, Indian coleus, makandi, HL-362, mao hou qiao rui hua. As with other members of the large diterpene class of plant metabolites, forskolin is derived from geranylgeranyl pyrophosphate (GGPP). Forskolin contains some unique functional elements, including the presence of a tetrahydropyran-derived heterocyclic ring. Forskolin is commonly used in laboratory research to increase levels of cyclic AMP by stimulation of adenylate cyclase.

Mechanism of action
Forskolin is commonly used in biochemistry to raise levels of cyclic AMP (cAMP) in the study and research of cell physiology. Forskolin activates the enzyme adenylyl cyclase and increases intracellular levels of cAMP. cAMP is an important second messenger necessary for the proper biological response of cells to hormones and other extracellular signals. It is required for cell communication in the hypothalamus/pituitary gland axis and for the feedback control of hormones via induction of corticotropin-releasing factor gene transcription. Cyclic AMP acts by activating cAMP-sensitive pathways such as protein kinase A and EPAC1.

Chemistry

Derivatives
Its derivatives include colforsin daropate, NKH477, and FSK88, which may be more potent than forskolin at raising cAMP. These derivatives may have pharmaceutical utility against bronchoconstriction and heart failure.

Chemical Synthesis 
A total chemical synthesis has been reported. The key step of this chemial synthesis is photocyclization of a synthetic intermediate in presence of oxygen and methylene blue, followed by a singlet oxygen Diels-Alder reaction.

Biosynthesis 
The heterocyclic ring is synthesized after the formation of the trans-fused carbon ring systems formed by a carbocation mediated cyclization. The remaining tertiary carbocation is quenched by a molecule of water. After deprotonation, the remaining hydroxy group is free to form the heterocyclic ring. This cyclization can occur either by attack of the alcohol oxygen onto the allylic carbocation formed by loss of diphosphate, or by an analogous SN2'-like displacement of the diphosphate. This forms the core ring system A of forskolin.

The remaining modifications of the core ring system A can putatively be understood as a series of oxidation reactions to form a poly-ol B which is then further oxidized and esterified to form the ketone and acetate ester moieties seen in forskolin. However, because the biosynthetic gene cluster has not been described, this putative synthesis could be incorrect in the sequence of oxidation/esterification events, which could occur in almost any order.

Fat loss

In animals, forskolin, or extracts of Coleus barbatus containing forskolin, reduce food intake, body weight, and fat mass. In humans, forskolin reduces body fat mass while increasing lean body mass. In mice, extracts of Coleus forskohlii exhibited dose-dependent liver toxicity although purified forskolin did not exhibit liver toxicity.

Other 
Forskolin has been used in traditional medicine for treating heart failure.

See also
Adenylyl cyclase
Cyclic AMP

References

External links 
 

Diterpenes
Vinyl compounds
Ketones
Triols
Acetate esters
Enzyme activators